Richard Karekin Cunningham (born October 12, 1944) is a former American football linebacker.  He played in the American Football League for the Buffalo Bills and in the National Football League for the Buffalo Bills, the Houston Oilers, and the Philadelphia Eagles from 1967 to 1973.  Cunningham played college football at the University of Arkansas and was drafted in the eighth round of the 1966 NFL Draft by the Detroit Lions and the fourth round of the Red Shirt portion of the 1966 AFL Draft by the Buffalo Bills.

While at Arkansas, Cunningham was a member of Xi Chapter of the Kappa Sigma Fraternity.

See also
Other American Football League players

References

External links
NFL.com player page

1944 births
Living people
Players of American football from Boston
American football centers
American football linebackers
American football offensive tackles
Arkansas Razorbacks football players
Buffalo Bills players
Houston Oilers players
Philadelphia Eagles players
American Football League All-Time Team
American Football League players